Fort Fraser is an unincorporated village of about 500 people, situated near the base of Fraser Mountain, close to the village municipality of Fraser Lake and the Nechako River. Originally established in 1806 as a North West Company fur trading post by the explorer Simon Fraser, it is one of present-day British Columbia's oldest permanent European-founded settlements. The area around the community is also recorded as the site of the first land in British Columbia cultivated by non-First Nations people.

In 1911, the fort was relocated to nearby Nadleh Village, and later closed in 1915. The present community is located at the site of the last spike of the Grand Trunk Pacific Railway, driven on April 7, 1914. Today, Fort Fraser is an active community sustained by both forestry and tourism.

Transportation
Via Rail's Jasper–Prince Rupert train calls at the Fort Fraser station.

Local events
The Fort Fraser Fall Fair is one of the oldest agricultural fairs in BC. The event has run annually since 1928, on the Labour Day weekend in September.

Local facilities
Local facilities include:

 Three churches - United Church of Canada, Apostolic Lutheran Church (est. 1928 by St. Mary's Anglican Church), and Church of the Nazarene
 Gas station/grocery store
 Automotive repair garage, tire sales
 Community hall
 Post-office
 Motel
 Laundromat
 Visitor information centre

Climate

Directions
Nearby communities of Fort Fraser include:

West on Hwy 16
 Fraser Lake - 21 km (13 mi)
 Burns Lake - 90 km (56 mi)
 Topley - 141 km (88 mi)
 Smithers - 234 km (145 mi)
 Terrace - 437 km (272 mi)
 Prince Rupert - 581 km (361 mi)

East on Hwy 16
 Vanderhoof - 38 km (24 mi)
 Fort St. James - 84 km (52 mi)
 Prince George - 134 km (83 mi)

See also
 Last Spike (Grand Trunk Pacific Railway)
 Fort Fraser (sternwheeler)

References

External links
 Fort Fraser website, maintained by British Columbia School District #91

Fort Fraser
Populated places in the Regional District of Bulkley-Nechako
Nechako Country
Fur trade
Hudson's Bay Company forts
North West Company forts
Designated places in British Columbia